The Neiman Marcus Award for Distinguished Service in the Field of Fashion was a yearly award created in 1938 by Carrie Marcus Neiman and Stanley Marcus. Unlike the Coty Award, it was not limited to American-based fashion designers. Recipients of the Neiman Marcus Awards include couturiers, non-American-based designers, journalists, manufacturers, and celebrities and style icons who had had a significant personal influence upon fashion such as Grace Kelly and Grace Mirabella. The award was typically presented to multiple recipients each year, rather than to a single individual, although Adrian was the sole winner in 1943, a feat repeated in 1957 by Coco Chanel. From 1969 the awards became increasingly intermittent, with ceremonies held in 1973, 1979, 1980, 1984 and 1995, the last year in which the awards were presented. For the final ceremony, the founder, Stanley Marcus, received one of his own awards.

Award winners
This is a complete list of recipients of the Neiman Marcus Fashion Award from 1938 onwards.

1938-1949

 1938
 Louise B. Gallagher
 John-Frederics
 Richard Koret
 Dorothy Liebes
 George Miller
 Germaine Monteil
 Dan Palter
 Nettie Rosenstein

 1939
 Elizabeth Arden
 Hattie Carnegie
 John Cavanagh
 Janet May
 Clare Potter

 1940
 Edna Woolman Chase
 Lilly Daché
 Elsa Schiaparelli
 Sylvan Stroock

 1941
Anthony Blotta
Omar Kiam
Eleanor LeMaire
Max Meyer
Carmel Snow
Madame Tobe

 1942
Betsy Blackwell
Norman Norell
Voris

 1943
Adrian

 1944
Brooke Cadwallader
Jo Copeland
Countess Mara
Ben King

 1945
Tina Leser
Vera Marghab
Maurice Rentner
Dr. Francis Taylor
Thea Tewi
Louis A Weinberg
Emily Wilkens

 1946
John M. Gates, design director for Steuben Glass Works
William H. and Faie Joyce of Joyce Shoes
Slim Keith (as Mrs. Leland Hayward)
William and Elizabeth Phelps
Adele Simpson

 1947
Christian Dior
Salvatore Ferragamo
Norman Hartnell
Irene Gibbons

 1948
 Mme. Henri Bonnet (wife of Henri Bonnet, French Ambassador to the United States 1944-54)
 Antonio del Castillo
 Claire McCardell
 Julius Ochs Adler

 1949
 Alice Cadolle
 David Evins
 Jacques Fath
 Gladys Geissman (Merry Hull)

1950-1959
 1950
Bonnie Cashin
Fleur Meyer
Gloria Swanson
Pauline Trigère

 1951
Ernestine Cannon
Jane Derby
Jacques Lesur
Michelle Murphy
Ben Zuckerman

 1952
Roger Fare
Anne Fogarty
Vincent Monte-Sano
Dolores del Río

 1953
Olga di Grésy
Charles James
Gilbert & Helen Orcel
Ben Sommers

 1954
 James Galanos
 Herbert & Beth Levine
 Emilio Pucci

 1955
Pierre Balmain
Henry Dreyfuss
Florence Eiseman
Grace Kelly
Sally Kirkland
Vera Maxwell

 1956
 Cecil Beaton
 Marie-Louise Bousquet
 Giuliana Camerino

 1957
Coco Chanel

 1958
 Helen Lee
 Jens Harald Quistgaard
 Yves Saint Laurent

 1959
 Emme
 Piero Fornasetti
 Rosalind Russell
 Arnold Scaasi

1960-1969
 1960
 Sylvia Pedlar
Roger Jean-Pierre
 Dinah Shore
Edward Burke Smith
Claude Staron

 1961
 Greer Garson
 Harry Rolnick
 Ferdinando Sarmi
 Roger Vivier
 Sydney Wragge

 1962
Jules-François Crahay
James Laver
Estée Lauder
Sports Illustrated

 1963
Georges Braque
Bud Kilpatrick
Margaret Clarke Miller
Maurice Tumarkin

 1964-1965
The awards for 1964 and 1965 were combined into one award for the two years
 Geoffrey Beene
 Mr & Mrs. Arthur Edelman
 Tzaims Luksus

 1966
 Mary Brosnan
 Hélène Gordon-Lazareff
 Lucie Ann Onderwyzer
 Mila Schön
 Jacques Tiffeau

 1967
 Valentino
 Fiamma Ferragamo
 The Artisans of Florence
 Giancarlo Venturini
 Lydia de Roma

 1968
Oscar de la Renta
Kenneth Jay Lane
Armi Ratia
Roland Jourdan

 1969
 Bill Blass
Anne Klein
Bernard Kayman
Emanuel Ungaro
Gloria Vanderbilt

1970-1995
 1973
 Ralph Lauren
 Levi Strauss & Co
 Hanae Mori
 Missoni
 Jean Muir

 1979
Giorgio Armani
Richard Avedon
Baccarat
Perry Ellis
Mary McFadden

 1980
 Karl Lagerfeld
 Judith Leiber

 1984
 Jack Lenor Larsen
 Issey Miyake

 1995
 Jean-Paul Goude
 Stanley Marcus
 Grace Mirabella
 Miuccia Prada

See also

 List of fashion awards

References

Fashion awards
Awards established in 1938
1938 establishments in the United States